Alexander Abreu Vázquez (born August 14, 1991) is a Puerto Rican professional basketball player for Cariduros de Fajardo of the Baloncesto Superior Nacional. Internationally, Abreu represents and plays for the Puerto Rican national team.

College career 
Abreu played for The University of Akron, which was on track for one of the best seasons in program history. After having drugs shipped in from Puerto Rico, he was arrested and the team was quickly eliminated from the NCAA tournament in the round of 64.

Professional career

Orléans Loiret Basket
On June 16, 2017, Abreu signed a one-year deal with Orléans Loiret Basket of the LNB Pro B.

Santeros de Aguada

Abreu won a championship with the Santeros de Aguada in 2019.

Cariduros de Fajardo

Abreu currently plays with the Cariduros de Fajardo of the BSN. After los Santeros de Aguada moved their franchise to the city of Fajardo.

National team career
Abreu represented Puerto Rico at the 2016 Centrobasket where he won a gold medal. Abreu also played at the 2017 FIBA AmeriCup where he averaged 4.7 points, 2.7 rebounds and 4.3 assists per game in two games.

References

External links
 Alex Abreu Vásquez at RealGM
 Akron Zips bio
 West Georgia Wolves bio

1991 births
Living people
Panteras de Aguascalientes players
Akron Zips men's basketball players
Champagne Châlons-Reims Basket players
Guaros de Lara (basketball) players
Maratonistas de Coamo players
Orléans Loiret Basket players
Sportspeople from Bayamón, Puerto Rico
Point guards
Puerto Rican men's basketball players
Puerto Rican people of Dominican Republic descent
Puerto Rican expatriate basketball people in France
Puerto Rican expatriate basketball people in Germany
Puerto Rican expatriate basketball people in Mexico
Santeros de Aguada basketball players
West Georgia Wolves men's basketball players